Civitella di Romagna is a comune (municipality) in the Province of Forlì-Cesena in the Italian region Emilia-Romagna, located about  southeast of Bologna and about  southwest of Forlì.

Civitella di Romagna borders the following municipalities: Cesena, Galeata, Meldola, Predappio, Santa Sofia, Sarsina.

References

External links
 Official website

Cities and towns in Emilia-Romagna